Barunda is a Census Town of Bagnan II Census Block according to Census of India, 2011. This town contains many localities like Ghoraghata, Pipulyan, and Nabasan. This town has one railway station of South Eastern Railway (India), Ghoraghata Rail Station.

Route

Nearest rail station
 Ghoraghata Rail Station

Nearest bus stop
 Nabasan Bus Stand

Places of interest

High schools
 Ananda Niketan Vidyamandir, the only high school in this town

Primary schools
 Ghoraghata Primary School
 Pipulyan Primary School
 Nabasan Nimno Buniyadi School

References

Cities and towns in Howrah district